The blue-and-white kingfisher (Todiramphus diops) is a species of bird in the family Alcedinidae.
It is endemic to North Maluku in Indonesia. It can be found on the islands of Morotai, Ngelengele, Halmahera, Damar, Ternate, Tidore, Moti, Bacan, Obi and Obilatu.

Its natural habitat is subtropical or tropical mangrove forests.

References

External links 

The Internet Bird Collection

blue-and-white kingfisher
Birds of the Maluku Islands
blue-and-white kingfisher
Taxonomy articles created by Polbot